Indian Falls is a census-designated place (CDP) in Plumas County, California, United States. The population was 54 at the 2010 census, up from 37 at the 2000 census.

Geography
Indian Falls is located at  (40.050816, -120.979897).

It was named after a set of waterfalls on Indian Creek.

Demographics

2010
The 2010 United States Census reported that Indian Falls had a population of 54. The racial makeup of Indian Falls was 50 (92.6%) White, 0 (0.0%) African American, 0 (0.0%) Native American, 1 (1.9%) Asian, 0 (0.0%) Pacific Islander, 1 (1.9%) from other races, and 2 (3.7%) from two or more races. Hispanic or Latino of any race were 4 people (7.4%).

The whole population lived in households, no one lived in non-institutionalized group quarters and no one was institutionalized.

There were 24 households, 7 (29.2%) had children under the age of 18 living in them, 15 (62.5%) were opposite-sex married couples living together, 1 (4.2%) had a female householder with no husband present, 1 (4.2%) had a male householder with no wife present.  There were 1 (4.2%) unmarried opposite-sex partnerships, and 0 (0%) same-sex married couples or partnerships. 6 households (25.0%) were one person and 1 (4.2%) had someone living alone who was 65 or older. The average household size was 2.25.  There were 17 families (70.8% of households); the average family size was 2.65.

The age distribution was 12 people (22.2%) under the age of 18, 1 people (1.9%) aged 18 to 24, 13 people (24.1%) aged 25 to 44, 26 people (48.1%) aged 45 to 64, and 2 people (3.7%) who were 65 or older.  The median age was 45.3 years. For every 100 females, there were 134.8 males.  For every 100 females age 18 and over, there were 121.1 males.

There were 33 housing units at an average density of 17.9 per square mile, of the occupied units 22 (91.7%) were owner-occupied and 2 (8.3%) were rented. The homeowner vacancy rate was 0%; the rental vacancy rate was 0%.  51 people (94.4% of the population) lived in owner-occupied housing units and 3 people (5.6%) lived in rental housing units.

2000
The 2000 census reported there were 37 people, 19 households, and 9 families in the CDP. The population density was 20.5 people per square mile (7.9/km). There were 24 housing units at an average density of 13.3 per square mile (5.1/km). The racial makeup of the CDP was 97.30% White and 2.70% Asian. 0.00% of the population were Hispanic or Latino of any race.

Of the 19 households 26.3% had children under the age of 18 living with them, 42.1% were married couples living together, 10.5% had a female householder with no husband present, and 47.4% were non-families. 31.6% of households were one person and 5.3% were one person aged 65 or older. The average household size was 1.95 and the average family size was 2.40.

The age distribution was 16.2% under the age of 18, 2.7% from 18 to 24, 32.4% from 25 to 44, 37.8% from 45 to 64, and 10.8% 65 or older. The median age was 44 years. For every 100 females, there were 117.6 males. For every 100 females age 18 and over, there were 93.8 males.

The median household income was $7,321 and the median family income  was $18,750. Males had a median income of $0 versus $0 for females. The per capita income for the CDP was $5,936. There were no families and 31.8% of the population living below the poverty line, including no under eighteens and 100.0% of those over 64.

Politics

References

Census-designated places in Plumas County, California
Census-designated places in California